Dawson Township is a township in Greene County, Iowa, USA.

History
Dawson Township was established in 1872. Dawson is the name of an early settler.

References

Townships in Greene County, Iowa
Townships in Iowa
1872 establishments in Iowa
Populated places established in 1872